L1014  is a dark nebula in the Cygnus constellation. It may be among the most centrally condensed small dark clouds known, perhaps indicative of the earliest stages of star formation processes. This cloud harbors at its core a very young low-mass star named L1014 IRS; some astronomers have suggested that this object may be a brown dwarf or even a rogue planet at the earliest stage of its lifetime.

References

External links
 The Starless Core That Isn't // Spitzer Image, Release Date: 11/09/04
 Spitzer Sees Ice and Warm Glows in Dark and Dusty Places // NASA 11.09.04

Cygnus (constellation)
Dark nebulae